The Shire of Beverley is a local government area in the Wheatbelt region of Western Australia about  southeast of Perth, the state capital. Its seat of government is the town of Beverley, which accommodates just over half of the Shire's population.

History

The Beverley Road District was proclaimed on 24 January 1871. It was initially far larger on its eastern and southern sides than the present shire, extending east to the colonial border.

The township of Beverley itself was separated as the Municipality of Beverley on 31 March 1892 and the East Beverley Road District separated on 18 October 1895.

The Brookton Road District was separated from Beverley on 26 April 1906. However, on 27 April 1906, the East Beverley district was abolished, partially re-absorbed into Beverley and partially into the new Brookton board.

The Municipality of Beverley was re-absorbed into the road district on 4 April 1913.

It was declared a shire and named the Shire of Beverley with effect from 1 July 1961 following the passage of the Local Government Act 1960, which reformed all remaining road districts into shires.

Wards
The Shire is divided into three wards, which became effective on 2 May 1987.

 North Ward (three councillors)
 West Ward  (three councillors)
 South Ward (three councillors)

Prior to 1986, the Shire was represented by eight councillors across four wards which had existed in some form since the amalgamation of the Municipal District in 1913:

 Kokeby Ward
 North East Ward
 Central Ward
 Dale Ward

Towns and localities
The towns and localities of the Shire of Beverley with population and size figures based on the most recent Australian census:

Population

Notable councillors
 Henry Lukin, Beverley Road Board member 1876; later a state MP
 Edmund Smith, Beverley Road Board member 1894–1896, chairman 1896; later a state MP
 Frank Broun, Beverley Road Board member 1902–1904, 1906–1914, 1917–1919, chairman 1908–1909, 1911–1914, 1917–1919; also a state MP

Heritage-listed places

As of 2023, 95 places are heritage-listed in the Shire of Beverley, of which 18 are on the State Register of Heritage Places.

References

External links
 

Beverley